The Borough of Wonthaggi was a local government area about  south-southeast of Melbourne, the state capital of Victoria, Australia. Unlike many local government areas, it was constituted under its own Act of Parliament, rather than the Local Government Act.

History

Wonthaggi was constituted under the Wonthaggi Borough Act 1910, by the Government of Victoria on 26 January 1911. The Local Government Act 1903 stipulated that boroughs could not exceed  in size, and that the longest straight-line distance between boundaries could not exceed  – neither was true of Wonthaggi. However, it did meet the stipulation of a minimum of 500 householders, and a minimum rate revenue of £300.

The borough was subdivided into wards in 1924, and again in 1975. In 1977, it absorbed North Wonthaggi from the Shire of Bass, and in August 1978, the ward system was abolished, after which all nine councillors represented the entire borough.

On 2 December 1994, the Borough of Wonthaggi was abolished, and along with the Shires of Bass and Phillip Island, and parts of the City of Cranbourne and the Shires of Korumburra and Woorayl, was merged into the newly created Bass Coast Shire.

Towns and localities

Towns
 Cape Paterson
 Wonthaggi*

Suburbs
 Harmers Haven
 North Wonthaggi
 South Dudley

* Council seat.

Population

* Estimate in the 1958 Victorian Year Book.

References

External links
 Victorian Places - Wonthaggi

Wonthaggi